Michael Keith Chiesa (born December 7, 1987) is an American professional mixed martial artist, and sports analyst who currently competes in the welterweight division in the Ultimate Fighting Championship (UFC). A professional mixed martial artist since 2008, Chiesa was the winner of FX's inaugural The Ultimate Fighter: Live. As of March 7, 2023, he is #13 in the UFC welterweight rankings.

Background
Chiesa was born in Aurora, Colorado but moved to Spokane County, Washington in his early years, growing up in Otis Orchards-East Farms with two older sisters. Having mostly just skateboarded until the age of 11, Chiesa started wrestling. Mere days before his sixteenth birthday, Chiesa moved out to live with his dad and stepmom in order to get away from his mentally and physically abusive biological mother. Chiesa wrestled at Shadle Park High School from where he graduated before attending Spokane Falls Community College for three days before dropping out in pursuit of a career in mixed martial arts.

Mixed martial arts career

Early career
Chiesa began his professional mixed martial arts career in 2008. He fought for several regional promotions in the Pacific Northwest, going undefeated in his first seven fights, before gaining an opportunity to appear on The Ultimate Fighter: Live reality show.

The Ultimate Fighter
Chiesa was one of 32 lightweight fighters announced by the UFC to participate in first live season of The Ultimate Fighter reality show.

Chiesa earned his way into The Ultimate Fighter house, and a $5,000 bonus, with a submission victory over Johnavan Vistante in the elimination rounds. He was chosen as the fifth pick for Team Faber. Chiesa's terminally ill father died shortly after his victory.

After teammate Al Iaquinta picked up the first win for Team Faber, his coach decided that Chiesa would fight Jeremy Larsen next. Chiesa would go on to defeat Larsen by unanimous decision after two rounds.

For his quarter-final fight, Chiesa was matched up with the highly favored prospect, Justin Lawrence. After a hard-fought two rounds, the judges declared a draw and the fight went to a third, "sudden-victory" round. Early in the third round, Chiesa was able to reverse Lawrence on the ground, gain a mount position and win the fight by TKO, earning a $5,000 knock-out bonus and a place in the semi-finals.

Chiesa was selected to fight Team Cruz fighter, James Vick, in the semi-final round. Chiesa won the fight by technical knockout in the second round. He moved on to the finals against Team Faber teammate Al Iaquinta.

Ultimate Fighting Championship
Chiesa officially made his UFC debut at The Ultimate Fighter 15 Finale on June 1, 2012, against fellow Team Faber teammate Al Iaquinta. Chiesa defeated Iaquinta by technical submission due to a rear-naked choke 2:47 into the opening round thus becoming The Ultimate Fighter: Live's inaugural winner and received Submission of the Night honors for his efforts.

Chiesa was expected to face Rafaello Oliveira on December 8, 2012, at UFC on Fox 5. However, Oliveira was forced out of the bout with a broken hand and replaced by Marcus LeVesseur. Then, the week of the event, Chiesa was forced out of the bout with LeVesseur with the shingles and the bout was scrapped altogether.

Chiesa next fought Anton Kuivanen on February 23, 2013, at UFC 157. Chiesa submitted Kuivanen with a rear-naked choke in the second round.

Chiesa was expected to face Reza Madadi on July 27, 2013, at UFC on Fox 8. However, on May 14, 2013, it was announced Madadi was pulled from the bout due to visa issues.  Chiesa instead faced Jorge Masvidal. Chiesa was stopped by Masvidal in the second round due to a d'arce choke submission, resulting in the first defeat in his professional career.

Chiesa next faced Ultimate Fighter winner Colton Smith on November 6, 2013, at UFC Fight Night 31. He won the fight via submission in the second round. The win also earned Chiesa his second Submission of the Night bonus award.

Chiesa faced Francisco Trinaldo at UFC 173 on May 24, 2014. He won the fight via unanimous decision.

Chiesa faced Joe Lauzon on September 5, 2014, at UFC Fight Night 50.  After a back and forth fight, Lauzon defeated Chiesa via TKO in the second round after opening a significant cut above Chiesa's right eye, forcing a doctor's stoppage.  The performance earned both participants Fight of the Night honors.

Chiesa faced Mitch Clarke on April 4, 2015, at UFC Fight Night 63. He won the fight by unanimous decision.

Chiesa faced Jim Miller on December 10, 2015, at UFC Fight Night 80. He won the fight via submission in the second round.  The bout also earned Chiesa his second Fight of the Night bonus award.

Chiesa faced Beneil Dariush on April 16, 2016, at UFC on Fox 19. He won the bout via submission in the second round and was also awarded a Performance of the Night bonus.

Chiesa was expected to face Tony Ferguson on July 13, 2016, at UFC Fight Night 91. However, Chiesa pulled out of the fight on June 27 citing a back injury and was replaced by promotional newcomer Lando Vannata.

Chiesa faced Kevin Lee on June 25, 2017, at UFC Fight Night 112. At a UFC summer kick off press conference in association with UFC 211, Kevin Lee mentioned Chiesa's mother had tickets to the show, in which Chiesa responded "don't you ever talk about my mom". This verbal altercation ultimately led to punches being thrown, and both were escorted from the stage. Chiesa lost the fight via technical submission at the end of the first round. He appealed to the Oklahoma State Athletic Commission to overturn the defeat, claiming referee Mario Yamasaki erred both in stopping the fight despite no tapout nor loss of consciousness and in allowing Lee to use illegal downward elbows, which cut his head. Later, the appeal was dismissed by the commission.

Albeit having one fight left on his contract, Chiesa signed a new four-fight deal with UFC at the end of August 2017.

UFC 223 and Conor McGregor incident
Chiesa was expected to face Anthony Pettis on April 7, 2018, at UFC 223; however, the bout was canceled after a backstage incident with Conor McGregor on April 5, 2018. McGregor threw a dolly at a UFC bus that Chiesa was traveling on and broke a window. Chiesa was hit by shards of glass, which opened a cut on his forehead, and needed hospitalization subsequently resulting in the fight's cancellation.

On September 10, 2018, Chiesa told the media he has sued McGregor for assault, battery, and intentional infliction of emotional distress. He also sued Barclay's Center for negligence, although he didn't disclose the amounts or further details of either of the cases. In early 2022 news surfaced that the attornies of both fighters filed for stipulation of discontinuance with prejudice, having reached a settlement in the process.

The bout with Pettis was rescheduled to UFC 226. At weight-ins, Chiesa weighed in at 157.5 pounds, 1.5 pounds over the lightweight limit of 156 pounds. As a result, the fight proceeded at a catchweight bout and Chiesa forfeited 30% of his purse to Pettis. Chiesa lost the fight via submission in round two. Shortly after the loss, Chiesa announced going up to welterweight division.

Move up to Welterweight
Chiesa faced Carlos Condit on December 29, 2018 at UFC 232. He won the fight via submission in the second round.

Chiesa faced Diego Sanchez on July 6, 2019 at UFC 239. He won the fight via unanimous decision. Chiesa dedicated the win to the memory of Jess Roskelley.

Chiesa faced Rafael dos Anjos on January 25, 2020 at UFC Fight Night 166. He won the fight via unanimous decision.

Chiesa faced Neil Magny on January 20, 2021 at UFC on ESPN 20. Chiesa won the fight via unanimous decision after controlling Magny on the ground for most of the 5 rounds. 

Chiesa faced Vicente Luque on August 7, 2021 at UFC 265. He lost the fight via a submission in round one.

Chiesa faced Sean Brady on November 20, 2021 at UFC Fight Night 198. He lost the bout via unanimous decision.

Chiesa is scheduled to face Li Jingliang on April 8, 2023 at UFC 287.

Film and television
Chiesa was featured in the award-winning mixed martial arts documentary Fight Life. The film is directed by James Z. Feng and was released in 2013.

Since UFC Fight Night: Thompson vs. Till on May 27, 2018, Chiesa has been regularly acting as a desk analyst at UFC events.

Championships and achievements
Ultimate Fighting Championship
The Ultimate Fighter: Live Tournament winner
Fight of the Night (Two times) 
Submission of the Night (Two times) 
Performance of the Night (One time) 
Lords of the Cage
LOTC Lightweight Championship (One time) 
MMAJunkie.com
2016 April Submission of the Month 
2018 December Submission of the Month

Mixed martial arts record

|-
|Loss
|align=center|18–6
|Sean Brady
|Decision (unanimous)
|UFC Fight Night: Vieira vs. Tate
|
|align=center|3
|align=center|5:00
|Las Vegas, Nevada, United States
|
|-
|Loss
|align=center|18–5
|Vicente Luque
|Submission (D'Arce choke)
|UFC 265
|
|align=center|1
|align=center|3:25
|Houston, Texas, United States
|
|-
|Win
|align=center|18–4
|Neil Magny
|Decision (unanimous)
|UFC on ESPN: Chiesa vs. Magny 
|
|align=center|5
|align=center|5:00
|Abu Dhabi, United Arab Emirates
|
|-
|Win
|align=center|17–4
|Rafael dos Anjos
|Decision (unanimous)
|UFC Fight Night: Blaydes vs. dos Santos 
|
|align=center|3
|align=center|5:00
|Raleigh, North Carolina, United States
|
|-
|Win
|align=center|16–4
|Diego Sanchez
|Decision (unanimous)
|UFC 239 
|
|align=center|3
|align=center|5:00
|Las Vegas, Nevada, United States
|
|-
|Win
|align=center|15–4
|Carlos Condit
|Submission (kimura)
|UFC 232 
|
|align=center|2
|align=center|0:56
|Inglewood, California, United States
|
|-
|Loss
|align=center|14–4
|Anthony Pettis
|Submission (triangle armbar)
|UFC 226 
|
|align=center|2
|align=center|0:52
|Las Vegas, Nevada, United States
|
|-
|Loss
|align=center|14–3
|Kevin Lee
|Technical Submission (rear-naked choke)
|UFC Fight Night: Chiesa vs. Lee
|
|align=center|1
|align=center|4:37
|Oklahoma City, Oklahoma, United States
|
|-
|Win
|align=center|14–2
|Beneil Dariush
| Submission (rear-naked choke)
|UFC on Fox: Teixeira vs. Evans
|
|align=center|2
|align=center|1:20
|Tampa, Florida, United States
|
|-
|Win
|align=center|13–2
|Jim Miller
| Submission (rear-naked choke)
|UFC Fight Night: Namajunas vs. VanZant
|
|align=center|2
|align=center|2:57
|Las Vegas, Nevada, United States
|
|-
|Win
|align=center|12–2
|Mitch Clarke
|Decision (unanimous)
|UFC Fight Night: Mendes vs. Lamas
|
|align=center|3
|align=center|5:00
|Fairfax, Virginia, United States
|
|-
|Loss
|align=center|11–2
|Joe Lauzon
|TKO (doctor stoppage)
|UFC Fight Night: Jacaré vs. Mousasi
|
|align=center|2
|align=center|2:14
|Mashantucket, Connecticut, United States
|
|-
|Win
|align=center|11–1
| Francisco Trinaldo
|Decision (unanimous)
|UFC 173
|
|align=center|3
|align=center|5:00
|Las Vegas, Nevada, United States
|
|-
|Win
|align=center|10–1
| Colton Smith
|Submission (rear-naked choke)
|UFC: Fight for the Troops 3
|
|align=center|2
|align=center|1:41
|Fort Campbell, Kentucky, United States
|
|-
|Loss
|align=center|9–1
| Jorge Masvidal
|Submission (D'Arce choke)
|UFC on Fox: Johnson vs. Moraga
|
|align=center|2
|align=center|4:59
|Seattle, Washington, United States 
|
|-
|Win
|align=center|9–0
| Anton Kuivanen
|Submission (rear-naked choke)
|UFC 157
|
|align=center|2
|align=center|2:29
|Anaheim, California, United States 
|
|-
|Win
|align=center|8–0
| Al Iaquinta
|Technical Submission (rear-naked choke)
|The Ultimate Fighter: Live Finale
|
|align=center|1
|align=center|2:47
|Las Vegas, Nevada, United States 
|
|-
|Win
|align=center|7–0
| Darrell Fenner
|Submission (rear-naked choke)
|CageSport 16
|
|align=center|1
|align=center|0:45
|Tacoma, Washington, United States
|
|-
|Win
|align=center|6–0
| Matt Coble
|Submission (rear-naked choke)
|Lords of the Cage 6
|
|align=center|1
|align=center|2:13
|Manson, Washington, United States
|
|-
|Win
|align=center|5–0
| Evian Rodriguez
|Submission (rear-naked choke)
|Lords of the Cage 5
|
|align=center|1
|align=center|1:03
|Airway Heights, Washington, United States
|
|-
|Win
|align=center|4–0
| Darcy James
|Submission (D'Arce choke)
|Battlefield Fight League 7
|
|align=center|1
|align=center|0:53
|Nanaimo, British Columbia, Canada
|
|-
|Win
|align=center|3–0
| Andy Paves
|Decision (unanimous)
|Rumble on the Ridge 14
|
|align=center|3
|align=center|5:00
|Snoqualmie, Washington, United States
|
|-
|Win
|align=center|2–0
| Brian Wilson
|Decision (unanimous)
|Arnett Promotions 3
|
|align=center|3
|align=center|5:00
|Clarkston, Washington, United States
|
|-
|Win
|align=center|1–0
| Charon Spain
|Submission (triangle choke)
|Thunder and Lightning
|
|align=center|2
|align=center|N/A
|Lapwai, Idaho, United States
|

|-
|Win
|align=center|4–0
| James Vick
| TKO (punches)
| rowspan=4|The Ultimate Fighter: Live
| (Live airdate)
|align=center|2
|align=center|1:55
|rowspan=4|Las Vegas, Nevada, United States
|
|-
|Win
|align=center|3–0
| Justin Lawrence
| TKO (punches)
| (Live airdate)
|align=center|3
|align=center|1:02
|
|-
|Win
|align=center|2–0
| Jeremy Larsen
| Decision (unanimous) 
| (Live airdate)
|align=center|2
|align=center|5:00
|
|-
|Win
|align=center|1–0
| Johnavan Vistante
| Submission (rear-naked choke) 
| (Live airdate)
|align=center|1
|align=center|2:05
|
|-

See also
 List of current UFC fighters
 List of male mixed martial artists

References

External links
 
 

1987 births
American people of Italian descent
Living people
People from Aurora, Colorado
People from Spokane Valley, Washington
Sportspeople from Spokane, Washington
Mixed martial artists from Washington (state)
American male mixed martial artists
Mixed martial artists utilizing Brazilian jiu-jitsu
American practitioners of Brazilian jiu-jitsu
Ultimate Fighting Championship male fighters